The W110 was Mercedes-Benz's entry level line of midsize automobiles in the mid-1960s. One of Mercedes' range of "Fintail" models, the W110 initially was available with either a 1.9 L M121 gasoline or 2.0 L OM621 diesel inline-four. It was introduced with the 190c and 190Dc sedans in April 1961, replacing the W120 180c/180Dc and W121 190b/190Db.

The W110 line was refreshed in July 1965 to become the 200 and Diesel 200D (model year 1966 for North America); at the same time, a six-cylinder 230 (successor to the Mercedes 220) became part of the W110 line.  Production lasted just three more years, with the W115 220 and 220D introduced in 1968.  The W110 and the 6-cylinder W111 were the first series of Mercedes cars to be extensively crash tested for occupant safety.

First series (1961–1965)

The 190c and 190Dc replaced the W120 180c/180Dc and W121 190b/190Db as Mercedes-Benz's line of less-expensive four-cylinder sedans.  The "D" denoted a Diesel engine, a technology pioneered by Mercedes-Benz and championed despite widespread derision in the motoring press. The body was derived from the W111 series but with a 145 mm shorter nose and round headlights (which gave a front-end appearance more reminiscent of the W120/121 "Ponton" models). The rear end was identical to the W111 220b (the 220b was the base model of the W111 series). The interior layout and dimensions were also identical to the W111 220b, but with fewer options such as fixed-back seats and bakelite trim on the dashboard (as opposed to wood in the W111 models). Because the 190c and 190Dc models were basically a W111 220b with a shorter front, they offered the same interior and luggage space as the W111 series but with smaller and more fuel efficient engines. This made them extremely popular with taxi drivers. Production of the 190Dc exceeded that of the petrol-engined 190c by nearly 100,000 units.

Models

Second series (1965–1968)

The second series of 4-cylinder cars lasted just a few years.  Production of the new 200, 200D and 230 models commenced in July, 1965,  at the Sindelfingen plant. The 200 and 200D replaced the 190c and 190Dc models respectively. The engine in the 200 had the bore increased from 85 to 87 mm, giving a 1988 cc displacement, and was fitted with twin carburetors (the 190c had a single carburetor). The OM621 diesel engine in the 200D was essentially identical to that of the 190Dc (which was actually a 1988 c.c. unit despite the car being labelled as a '190') but was improved by using a five main bearing crankshaft instead of the original three.

Visually, the second series models had the front indicators relocated from the top of the front fenders to below the headlights. At the rear, the tail lights were squared off and the chrome trim was revised to feature two horizontal trim strips instead of chrome-trimmed tail fins. All models now featured air outlets with chrome trim on the C-pillars (identical to the W111 models). Inside, there were very few changes except all models now featured reclining front seats (excluding the bench seats), which had previously been an option on the 190c and 190Dc. The 230 had a central armrest in the back seat as standard.

Further changes occurred in late 1967, with the beginning of the 1968 model year. 1968 models were equipped with collapsible steering columns to meet American safety regulations. Mirrors, interior door handles, and dashboard switchgear were also changed, matching those on the later W108/114/115 series cars.

All three of the W110 second series cars ended production in January 1968 with the introduction of the W115 220 and 220D.

Models

Timeline

Estate car

An estate version of the 230S four-cylinder-engined car was introduced in 1965 and achieved modest success in certain markets including Germany, Belgium and the UK.  The car was actually the result of a conversion carried out by the Mechelen based company Société Anonyme pour l'Importation de Moteurs et d'Automobiles (IMA) which was already assembling saloon version of the cars from CKD kits and which was also the Belgian Mercedes-Benz importer. With the reduction in tariffs that followed the development of the EEC, small-scale assembly of this kind within the EEC but outside Germany no longer made sense, and assembly of the Mercedes-Benz cars at Mechelen stopped in 1973, by which time the plant had assembled 78,568 four-cylinder Mercedes-Benz cars based on the W111 and its successor model.

References

Notes

Bibliography

General

Workshop manuals

External links

 http://www.heckflosse.nl/
24 Hours Of LeMons People's Choice-Winning 1965 Mercedes-Benz 190

W110
W110
Cars introduced in 1961
Cars of Germany
Limousines
Rear-wheel-drive vehicles